Bobbie V. Harder is an American politician serving in the Minnesota House of Representatives since 2023. A member of the Republican Party of Minnesota, Harder represents District 17B in the western Twin Cities metropolitan area, which includes the cities of Carver and Watertown and parts of Carver, McLeod, and Sibley Counties in Minnesota.

Early life, education and career 
Harder was born in Le Sueur, Minnesota and attended college at South Dakota State University, earning a bachelor's degree in sociology, psychology, and criminal justice. Harder served as a county commissioner for Sibley County from 2015 to 2023.

Minnesota House of Representatives 
Harder was first elected to the Minnesota House of Representatives in 2022, after redistricting and the retirement of Republican incumbent Glenn Gruenhagen who decided to run for a seat in the Minnesota Senate. Harder serves on the Agriculture Finance and Policy, State and Local Government Finance and Policy, and Workforce Development Finance and Policy Committees.

Electoral history

Personal life 
Harder lives in Henderson, Minnesota with her husband, Neal, and has one child.

References

External links 

Members of the Minnesota House of Representatives
Living people
Year of birth missing (living people)